James Shibest (born October 31, 1964) is an American football coach and former player. He previously served as the Special Teams Coordinator and Tight End coach at Virginia Tech. From 1996 to 1999, he was head coach at Butler Community College, where he led the Grizzlies to two NJCAA National Championships. For most of his career, Shibest has been a Special Teams coach.

Coaching career
Shibest began his coaching career as an offensive graduate assistant working with the running backs and wide receivers at Oklahoma State for the 1990 and 1991 football seasons.

From Oklahoma State, Shibest moved on to Independence Community College where he was the offensive coordinator in 1992, and the Defensive Back coach in 1993.

In 1994 and 1995, Shibest was the offensive coordinator for Garden City Community College.

In 1996, Shibest landed his first head coaching job at Butler Community College. In four years (1996–1999) Shibest led the Grizzlies to two KJCCC Conference titles and two NJCAA National Titles. He was twice named the KJCAA Coach of the year and also twice named the NJCAA Coach of the year.

In 2000, James Shibest joined Houston Nutt's staff at Arkansas as the Tight End Coach and Special Teams Coordinator. Shibest also coached Wide Receivers during his tenure at Arkansas.

In 2008, Shibest followed Houston Nutt to Ole Miss as the Tight End coach and Special Teams Coach.

in 2012, Shibest joined Justin Fuente's staff at Memphis in the same position. 

He then followed Fuente to Virginia Tech in 2016.

Playing career
Shibest played Wide Receiver at Arkansas from 1983 to 1987. He earned All-Southwest Conference honors in 1984 and 1986.
In high school, Shibest was a Prep All-American Wide Receiver at MacArthur High School in Houston, Texas.
He also played one game in 1987 for the Atlanta Falcons as a replacement during that year's NFL player strike.

Personal life
Shibest and his wife, Dianna, have two children, James John III and Jordyn Grace.

Head coaching record

References

External links
 Virginia Tech profile

1964 births
Living people
American football wide receivers
Arkansas Razorbacks football players
National Football League replacement players
Oklahoma State Cowboys football coaches
Ole Miss Rebels football coaches
Memphis Tigers football coaches
Virginia Tech Hokies football coaches
Junior college football coaches in the United States